Gagarinia is a genus of longhorn beetles of the subfamily Lamiinae, containing the following species:

 Gagarinia aureolata (Lane, 1950)
 Gagarinia borgmeieri (Bondar, 1938)
 Gagarinia melasma Galileo & Martins, 2004
 Gagarinia mniszechii (Chabrillac, 1857)

References

Hemilophini